NNS can stand for:

 New neoclassical synthesis (economics)
 NASCAR Nationwide Series (previous name of the NASCAR Xfinity Series)
 Nashville Number System (music)
 National Numeracy Strategy (UK education)
 Near Net Shape
 Nearest neighbor search
 Nearly-new sale
 Newport News Shipbuilding, a shipyard
 Nigerian Navy Ship
 Nippon Television Network System
 Non-Nutritive Sweetener, i.e. a Sugar substitute